SDL may refer to:

Computing
 Specification and Description Language, defined by ITU
 Simple DirectMedia Layer, a C programming language library
 Services Description Language, a Microsoft fore-runner to Web Services Description Language
 Scene Description Language, used by POV-Ray
 Structure Definition Language of OpenVMS
  Security Development Lifecycle, a software development process

Organizations
 Party of the Democratic Left (Slovakia) (SDĽ, 1990–2004)
 Former Party of the Democratic Left (Czech Republic)
 Party of the Democratic Left (2005), SDĽ, Slovakia
 Scottish Defence League, a far-right anti-Muslim organisation
 Social Democratic League of America, 1917-1920
 Software Development Laboratories, the original name of what is today known as Oracle Corporation
 Soqosoqo Duavata ni Lewenivanua, a political party in Fiji
 Space Dynamics Laboratory, at Utah State University, US
 SDL plc (formerly SDL International), a UK translation tool company

Other uses
 Saudi Digital Library
 Shielded data link connector, an electrical signal connector
 Sexual division of labour
 Sound Digital - also known as SDL National, a digital radio multiplex in the United Kingdom
 Standard Deontic Logic, an extension of classical propositional logic
 Sundsvall-Härnösand Airport, by IATA airport code
 Scottsdale Airport, by FAA airport code